Savar-e Bala (also Romanized as Savār-e Bālā; also known as Savār) is a village in Zavkuh Rural District, Pishkamar District, Kalaleh County, Golestan Province, Iran. At the 2006 census, its population was 287, in 62 families.

References 

Populated places in Kalaleh County